Italian Army gorget patches ( or ) are worn by all army personnel on the collars of the shirts and jackets of their service uniforms and formal uniforms. The gorget patches identify the arm (Infantry, cavalry, artillery, engineer, signals, transport and material), corps (Health, commissariat, engineers), or speciality within an arm or corps a soldier belongs to. Generals wear golden stars instead of a gorget patches, while army recruits wear silver stars until they are assigned to a unit after basic training. Originally made from colored cloth, respectively embroidered cloth for Granatieri, Carabinieri and general staff members, gorget patches have been made since 1973 from enamelled metal.

 All patches below are worn on the right side.

Multi-arm units 
Multi-arm units combine personnel from different arms and corps of the army and are therefore grouped separately from other gorget patches.

 Note 1: originally the 28th Infantry Regiment "Pavia", retains the regiment's patch with a superimposed yellow chess knight
 Note 2: originally infantry regiments, but now considered mutli-arm units as they train troops for all arms and corps of the army
 Note 3: originally part of the artillery, therefore the patch retains the artillery's black and yellow
 Note 4: has the rank of a speciality of the army (i.e. ranks below the arms and corps of the army, but is set apart from them)
 Note 5: originally part of the artillery respectively the signal arm, therefore the patch combines the artillery's yellow and the signal arms' electric blue
 Note 6: includes army archives, army penitentiary units, etc.

Infantry

Line infantry 

Line infantry regiments wear rectangular gorget patches with a unique color combination for each regiment. Line infantry regiments were always raised in pairs, forming together a brigade and from 1936 a division. Originally the gorget patches of units from other arms and corps assigned to the division were overlaid on the gorget patch of the two regiments of a brigade or division. However, as after World War II infantry regiments with different gorget patches made up the army's divisions this practice was abandoned. Today the only exception is the Mechanized Brigade "Sassari", which still fields its two original regiments. Infantry personnel not assigned to a regiment wear a scarlet patch with two points. The 66th Infantry Regiment "Trieste" and 87th Infantry Regiment "Friuli" modified their gorget patches once they became part of the Airmobile Brigade "Friuli".

Infantry specialities 
Infantry specialities are units that differ from the line infantry in their recruiting, equipment, headdress, tasks and training:
 Granatieri: originally grenadiers attached to every line regiment of the Royal Sardinian Army they became a royal guard regiment. Today the minimum height to join the speciality is 190 cm and members of the regiment wear a bearskin cap. Granatieri wear a double-sized, rectangular scarlet gorget patch with a stylized silver Austrian knot. The gorget patches of units from other arms and corps assigned to the Mechanized Brigade "Granatieri di Sardegna" are overlaid on the Grantieri's patch.
 Bersaglieri: originally skirmishers, scouts and sharpshooters of the Royal Sardinian Army. Members were chosen for their shooting skills and stamina. During the Cold War they were employed as mechanized infantry. Bersaglieri wear a red fez with their service uniform and wide-brimmed black hat with a bushel of wood grouse feathers to their ordinary and ceremonial uniforms. Bersaglieri wear a crimson gorget patch with two points.
 Alpini: originally mountain infantry recruited locally in the Alpine valleys. Alpini wear a brown felt cap with their  service uniform and the Cappello Alpino with to their ordinary and ceremonial uniforms. Alpini wear a green gorget patch with two points. Unlike the Granatieri and Bersaglieri the Alpini have branched out and artillery, engineer, signals, transport and material, medical, etc. units have acquired the Alpini's headgear and traditions, which led to gorget patches that combine the Alpini's gorget patch with other arms and corps' gorget patches.
 Paracadutisti: the first paratrooper units were raised shortly before World War II and were an all-volunteer formation. Today the paratroopers retain above average requirements for recruits. Paracadutisti wear a red beret and azure rectangular gorget patches with a golden wing with seven feathers, a white parachute, and a silver Gladius with scarlet crossguard. Like the Alpini the Paracadutisti have branched out and units from other arms and corps assigned to the Paratroopers Brigade "Folgore" and the Army Special Forces Command wear now a combination of their gorget patch and the Paracadutisti's patch.
 Lagunari: are the armies youngest speciality and were raised to defend the Venetian lagoon. Originally they were recruited from Venice and the communities surrounding the Venetian lagoon. They wear a green beret and scarlet rectangular gorget patches with a tapered top, below which the winged golden Lion of Saint Mark with a white aureola, holding a sword in his right paw and resting his left paw on a closed bible. Behind the lion are two crossed rifles and an anchor and above him a golden crown.

Until 1 June 1999 the Carristi (Tankers) were a speciality of the infantry, which on that date was transferred to the cavalry.

Special forces 
The army's three special forces regiment's combine the infantry speciality gorget patch with two points and the paratroopers symbol, with the color of the speciality they descend from. Green for the Alpini, Azure for the Paracadutisti, and black for the Arditi, a World War I infantry speciality disestablished in 1920.

Disbanded line infantry regiments 
The gorget patches of disbanded regiments are an integral part of each regiment's traditions and insignia. In case one of the regiments listed below is reformed, then the corresponding gorget patch will be issued to regiment's personnel. Italian infantry regiments were always raised in pairs, which formed together one brigade. The regiments were initially only numbered and identified as "[regiment's number] Regiment of the Brigade "[brigade's name]"". Only during World War I did the brigade's name pass to the regiments. Before World War II the army formed binary divisions with sister regiments, which in some cases received the name of the division they were assigned to. If such a renaming occurred during World War II the division's name follows the regiment's name in brackets: i.e. the 65th and 66th Regiments "Valtellina" entered the 101st Motorized Division "Trieste" and were renamed "Trieste". Therefore, in the list below these two regiments are listed as: "65th, [66th] Regiment "Valtellina" ("Trieste")".

The regiments 1 to 18 were formed before 1848 as units of the Royal Sardinian Army. The regiments 19 to 94 were formed between the First Italian War of Independence and 1884. The regiments 95 to 282, with the exception of the 182nd, were raised during World War I. The 182nd Infantry Regiment "Garibaldi" is the only Italian infantry regiment raised after World War II and the only regiment of the army to not have received gorget patches. The regiment's 233 to 282 were raised in 1917 and received gorget patches divided horizontally twice. The 291st and 292nd Infantry Regiment "Zara" were raised during World War II. The regiments of the 300 series were raised during World War II to augment some of the binary divisions. Regiments, whose flags are currently assigned to active units, are in square brackets.

Cavalry 
The Cavalry is divided since 1 June 1999 in two specialities: line cavalry and tankers (= personnel of tank regiments). On 1 June 1999 the three traditional cavalry specialities Dragoni (Dragoons), Lancieri (Lancers) and Cavalleggeri (Chevau-léger) were united in the new speciality "Line cavalry". On the same date the tankers speciality was transferred from the infantry to the cavalry.

Line cavalry personnel wear regiment-affiliated colored gorget patches with three points. Personnel of the cavalry that is not assigned to a regiment wear an orange gorget patch with three points. Tankers, whose speciality was founded as part of the infantry, continue to wear a two-pointed gorget patch, which has traditionally been the patch for infantry specialties. The tankers' gorget patch is red with two points in a light blue field.

Disbanded cavalry regiments 
The gorget patches of disbanded regiments are an integral part of each regiment's traditions and insignia. In case one of the regiments listed below is reformed, then the corresponding gorget patch will be issued to regiment's personnel.

Artillery 
Artillery personnel wear black gorget patches with one point and a yellow edge. Currently five variations and one speciality (Anti-aircraft artillery) are officially sanctioned.

Note: As of 2020 no units wear these insignias.

Engineer  
Engineer personnel wear black gorget patches with one point and a crimson edge. Currently one speciality (Sappers) and four variations thereof are officially sanctioned. The Sappers Speciality's gorget patch symbol is a black grenade from which a five-tongued red flame emerges, with a metallic gladius over flame and grenade. The other three specialities of the engineer: pioneers, bridge engineers, and railway engineers wear the standard engineer gorget patch.

Note: As of 2020 no unit wears this insignia.

Signals 
Signal personnel wear electric blue gorget patches with two points and an amaranth edge. Currently four variations are officially sanctioned.

Transport and Material 
Transport and Material ( - TRAMAT) personnel wear black gorget patches with two points on azure background. Currently four variations are officially sanctioned.

Note: As of 2020 no unit wears this insignia.

Army Commissariat Corps 
The Army Commissariat Corps was formed on 1 January 1998 by the merger of the Army Commissariat Corps and the Army Administration Corps. Before the merger Commissariat Corps personnel wore violet gorget patches with one point, while Administration Corps personnel wore black gorget patches with one point and a sky blue edge. The personnel of the Commissariat Corps tasked with the role of food supplies wore sky blue gorget patches with one point. These three gorget patches were combined with the gorget patches of specialities of other arms and corps, resulting in dozens of variations. After the merger personnel wore black gorget patches with one point and a double-colored edge in violet and sky blue. This gorget patch was also combined with other gorget patches resulting in dozens of new variations. In 2003 the Commissariat Corps introduced a rectangular blue gorget patch with a golden laurel wreath, which is not combined with any other patch.

Examples of the disestablished Army Commissariat Corps and the Army Administration Corps gorget patches and their variations:

Army Health Corps 
The Army Health Corps is the result of the merger of the Army Medical Corps and Army Veterinary Corps on 1 January 1998. The corps' personnel wears two different types of gorget patches: amaranth with one point for medical personnel, and sky blue with one point for veterinary personnel. The medical corps also distinguishes between medical officers and personnel. For each type of patch five variations are officially sanctioned. In 2009 the medical officers gorget patch was differentiated to include pharmacists, dentists, and psychologists.

Army Corps of Engineers 
The Army Corps of Engineers was formed on 9 October 1980 by unifying the army's technical services. The Army Corps of Engineers conducts technological research, tests and evaluates the army's acquisitions, and maintains and updates the army's geographic data. All members of the Army Corps of Engineers are officers and wear rectangular black gorget patches with a colored border and a profile of the head of Minerva facing inward.

The army's technical services wore rectangular black gorget patches with a colored border.

Special Voluntary Auxiliary Corps 
The Italian Army Special Voluntary Auxiliary Corps of the Association of the Italian Knights of the Sovereign Military Order of Malta ( - Corpo Militare EI-SMOM) is a volunteer corps providing medical support to the Italian Army. Members of the corps wear Italian Army uniforms with a Maltese cross instead of the Italian flag and one of four approved gorget patches:
 a rectangular red patch with a white border for troops and NCOs of the Order
 a rectangular red patch with a white border and a violet point for commissariat officers
 a rectangular red patch with a white border and an amaranth point for medical or pharmacist officers
 a rectangular red patch with a white border and a black point with a bright yellow edge for officer commanders of hospital units

World War II

Royal Italian Army 
During World War II the units of the Royal Italian Army wore gorget patches of different size and form, but with the same colors. The gorget patches had a size of 60 x 32 mm and were made from colored cloth. Below follow a few examples of these historic gorget patches, while all of them can be found on Wiki Commons at: Royal Italian Army gorget patches.

Divisions carried the colors of their two infantry regiments, which was then combined with the artillery, engineer, supply and medical gorget patches. Below follow the gorget patches of the 13th Infantry Division "Re" and 17th Infantry Division "Pavia".

Grenadier, Alpini, armored/motorized, and paratrooper divisions had their own set of gorget patches.

Bersaglieri, and the troops assigned to divisional mortar, machine gun, and anti-tank battalions carried the same gorget patches across all divisions. The infantry regiments assigned to motorized divisions combined their traditional regimental gorget patch with the azure color of the armored and motorized forces. Below the patch of the 61st and 62nd Infantry Regiments "Sicilia" of the 102nd Motorized Division "Trento" is given as an example for motorized regiments.

Each Cavalry regiment had its distinct gorget patch. Associated with the cavalry were the tank groups of the three cavalry divisions, which had been raised by the Regiment "Cavalleggeri Guide" and therefore combined the form of the tank infantry gorget patch with the color scheme of the "Cavalleggeri Guide".

For units that were not assigned to divisions - i.e. Corps Artillery - basic gorget patches without any associated regimental colors were used.

Coastal units 
Coastal divisions were reserve units and new gorget patches were created for them: for the division patches with a triangle, and for the brigades a square with three white lines.

CC.NN. 
During World War II the paramilitary wing of the Italian National Fascist Party, the Milizia Volontaria per la Sicurezza Nazionale (MVSN), also known as "Blackshirts" (abbreviated as CC.NN.) raised four divisions, which were attached to the Royal Italian Army for the invasion of Egypt. Additionally the MVSN activated its paramilitary legions and battalions, which were attached to the army's divisions. The MVSN units had their own distinct gorget patches.

Bibliography

External links 
 Italian Army Website: Gorget patches
 National Former Officers Union of Italy Website: Army Uniform Regulations

References

Italian Army
Military uniforms